Lewis McKenzie (October 7, 1810 – June 28, 1895) was a nineteenth-century politician, merchant and railroad president from Virginia.

Biography
Born in Alexandria, District of Columbia, McKenzie pursued an academic course as a young adult and prominently engaged in shipping and mercantile pursuits, founding and becoming president of the Alexandria, Loudoun and Hampshire Railroad. He was also president of the First National Bank.

He was civically minded and began his political career as a Whig and was a member of the Alexandria County common council from 1843-1850 during which time he instigated the final push for retrocession in 1846.  He was a member of the city council of Alexandria from 1855 to 1859; and was acting mayor of the city from 1861 to 1863. At various times he was the presiding justice of the magistrate court and a Brigadier General of the town's militia.

McKenzie was elected a Unionist to the United States House of Representatives to fill a vacancy in 1863, serving from February to March of that year and afterward returned to the Alexandria city council, serving again until 1866 and returning a third time in 1868, serving again until 1870. He returned to the House as a Conservative in 1869, serving from 1870 to 1871. In 1870 he ran as the Republican candidate and lost. In 1874 he ran for the state senate and lost. He was appointed postmaster of Alexandria in 1878. McKenzie returned to the city council for the last time in 1887, serving until 1891. He died in Alexandria on June 28, 1895 and was interred there in Presbyterian Cemetery.

Election of 1869
McKenzie was elected to the U.S. House of Representatives unopposed.

References

External links
 Retrieved on 2009-5-13
 Lewis McKenzie at Find A Grave

1810 births
1895 deaths
Republican Party members of the United States House of Representatives from Virginia
Mayors of Alexandria, Virginia
Virginia city council members
People of Virginia in the American Civil War
Virginia postmasters
Conservative Party of Virginia members of the United States House of Representatives
Virginia Unionists
Unionist Party members of the United States House of Representatives
19th-century American politicians